Belltown is an unincorporated community in Polk County, in the U.S. state of Tennessee.

A large share of Belltown's original inhabitants had the surname Bell, hence the name.

References

Unincorporated communities in Polk County, Tennessee
Unincorporated communities in Tennessee